Jean-Pierre Grünfeld is a French nephrologist. He was a doctor at the Necker-Enfants malades hospital and a professor at the University of Paris Descartes (Paris V). He is Membre correspondant of the French Academy of sciences (elected 1986) and a foreign correspondant member of the Royal Academy of Medicine of Belgium (elected 1996). He is a Chevalier (Knight) of France's Legion of Honour (1995).

He is the author and co-author of more than 300 scientific publications.

Cancer plan 
In February 2009, Professor Jean-Pierre Grünfeld submitted to President Nicolas Sarkozy his proposals for giving "new impetus" to the fight against cancer, following criticisms made by the Court of Auditors and the High Council of Public Health against the Cancer Plan 2003-2007.

AIRG-France 
Jean-Pierre Grünfeld is Honorary President of the Scientific Council of AIRG-France (Association pour l'Information et la recherche sur les maladies Rénales Génétiques) of which he is one of the founders, with Dr Ginette Albouze and Ghislaine Vignaud.

Books 

 Médecine de la femme enceinte, by William M Barron, Marshall D Lindheimer, John M Davison, Jean-Pierre Grünfeld. Flammarion Medicine (January 4, 1994).
 Cas cliniques en néphrologie-urologie, by Jean-Pierre Grünfeld and Bertrand Dufour. Medical Flammarion (January 8, 1992).

References

External links
Jean-Pierre Grünfeld, CV at the French Academy of Sciences 

French nephrologists
Members of the French Academy of Sciences
Year of birth missing (living people)
Living people